Pye Hill is a hamlet in the Erewash Valley, Nottinghamshire, England. The B600 road runs east–west through it. It was once served by the Pye Hill and Somercotes railway station.

Hamlets in Nottinghamshire
Ashfield District